Deer Lick Falls is a small waterfall from the Black Rock fork of the South Umpqua River in Douglas County, Oregon. Access to Deer Lick Falls is from Forest Road 28, approximately 4 miles northeast of South Umpqua Falls.

See also 
 List of waterfalls in Oregon

References

Waterfalls of Oregon
Waterfalls of Douglas County, Oregon